Shahrak-e Emam Khomeyni (also Romanized as Shahrak-e Emām Khomeynī) is a village in Aspas Rural District, Sedeh District, Eqlid County, Fars Province, Iran. At the 2006 census, its population was 298, in 62 families.

References 

Populated places in Eqlid County